Corona Female College was a female seminary, located in Corinth, Mississippi.

The school was founded by Rev. L. B. Gaston in 1857.  It was situated in a three-story building. The college had a lyceum society and the students published a literary magazine which was known as The Wreath.

Its main building was commandeered by the Union Army for use as a hospital during the nearby battle of Shiloh in 1862, as was the nearby Tishomingo Hotel.  The Union Army evacuated the area in 1864, burning the college's building.  Corona Female College never reopened.

See also
 Women's colleges in the United States
 Timeline of women's colleges in the United States

References

Defunct private universities and colleges in Mississippi
Former women's universities and colleges in the United States
Educational institutions established in 1857
Female seminaries in the United States
Education in Alcorn County, Mississippi
Educational institutions disestablished in 1862
History of women in Mississippi
1857 establishments in Mississippi